Nicolas Gill (born April 24, 1972 in Montreal, Quebec) is a Canadian judoka who competed at four consecutive Olympic Games. He is a two-time Olympic medalist, receiving a bronze in the middleweight (86 kg) division at his inaugural Olympiad in Barcelona. He received a silver medal in the men's half-heavyweight (100 kg) division at the 2000 Sydney Summer Olympics.

Gill was honored by his teammates as Canada's flag bearer in the opening ceremony at the 2004 Summer Olympics in Athens. A mild controversy developed after it was revealed that Gill had made comments in favour of Quebec separatism, and had voted 'yes' in the 1995 Quebec referendum. Gill went on the lose his opening match which eliminated him from the tournament.

In 2007, he received the prix reconnaissance from UQAM as a TÉLUQ student.

He has since become a coach; one of his athletes, Antoine Valois-Fortier, won a bronze medal at the 2012 London Summer Olympics.

See also
Judo in Quebec
Judo in Canada
List of Canadian judoka

References

External links

 
 
 
 Videos of Nicolas Gill in action (judovision.org)
 Canadian Olympic Committee

1972 births
Living people
Canadian male judoka
Canadian people of Indian descent
Olympic judoka of Canada
Olympic silver medalists for Canada
Olympic bronze medalists for Canada
Judoka at the 1992 Summer Olympics
Judoka at the 1996 Summer Olympics
Judoka at the 2000 Summer Olympics
Judoka at the 2004 Summer Olympics
Judoka at the 1995 Pan American Games
Judoka at the 1999 Pan American Games
Judoka at the 2003 Pan American Games
Sportspeople from Montreal
Olympic medalists in judo
Medalists at the 2000 Summer Olympics
Medalists at the 1992 Summer Olympics
Commonwealth Games gold medallists for Canada
Pan American Games gold medalists for Canada
Pan American Games silver medalists for Canada
Commonwealth Games medallists in judo
Pan American Games medalists in judo
Goodwill Games medalists in judo
Judoka at the 2002 Commonwealth Games
Competitors at the 1994 Goodwill Games
Medalists at the 1995 Pan American Games
Medalists at the 1999 Pan American Games
Medalists at the 2003 Pan American Games
Medallists at the 2002 Commonwealth Games